Exhyalanthrax is a small genus of bombyliid flies. Bombyliids are commonly known as bee flies due to their resemblance to bees. Exhyalanthrax are found in the Afrotropical realm and the Palearctic realm. Exhyalanthrax spp. are pupal parasitoids. Exhyalanthrax afer has been reared from pupae of tachinid and ichneumonid  parasitoids  of Thaumetopoea pityocampa and from the pupae of this species  and other Lepidoptera. It has also been bred from cocoons of Neodiprion sertifer. Several African species have been reared from the puparia of tsetse flies and from puparia of other Diptera. An Exhyalanthrax sp. has also been found  preying on  cockroach, (Heterogamisca chopardi Uvarov) oothecae in Saudi Arabia. It has been suggested that Exhyalanthrax might be utilised as
biological control agents especially in the battle against tsetse flies.

Species List

Exhyalanthrax abruptus (Loew, 1860)
Exhyalanthrax afer (Fabricius, 1794)
Exhyalanthrax argentifer Becker, 1916
Exhyalanthrax canarionae Báez, 1990
Exhyalanthrax collarti François, 1962
Exhyalanthrax contrarius Becker, 1916
Exhyalanthrax melanchlaenus (Loew, 1867)
Exhyalanthrax muscarius (Pallas, 1818)
Exhyalanthrax simonae (François, 1970)
Exhyalanthrax vicinalis Hesse, 1956

References

Bombyliidae
Diptera of Europe
Diptera of Africa
Diptera of Asia
Brachycera genera
Taxa named by Theodor Becker